Donald Calloway, MIC (born 29 June 1972) is an American author and Catholic priest in the Congregation of Marian Fathers of the Immaculate Conception of the Most Blessed Virgin Mary. He is known for his conversion story and his 2020 book, Consecration to St. Joseph: The Wonders of Our Spiritual Father.

Background 
Calloway was born on 29 June 1972 in Dearborn, Michigan. He spent his early years in West Virginia and grew up in southern California, in Los Angeles and San Diego. He has described himself as angry and drug addicted in his teenage years and is described as a 'high-school dropout'. He has said that he was using drugs by the age of 11 and was promiscuous. 

While living in Japan, Calloway became involved with the Yakuza, the Japanese mafia, and served as a "drug runner", running drugs and money to casinos in Honshu. When he was 15 years old, Calloway was forcibly removed from the country of Japan for his criminal activity and mafia involvement. 

Following his extradition back to the United States, Calloway was committed to two drug and alcohol rehabilitation centers in Pennsylvania: New Beginnings at Cove Forge and Charter Fairmont Institute. After his failed rehabilitations, he was imprisoned in Louisiana upon turning eighteen.

One night after declining to go out with friends, Calloway began to read the book, The Queen of Peace Visits Medjugorje. He credits this book for changing his life, after reading which he converted to Roman Catholicism.

Calloway was ordained a priest on 31 May 2003 at The National Shrine of The Divine Mercy in Stockbridge, Massachusetts. He has a B.A. (Franciscan University of Steubenville), M.Div. (Dominican House of Studies, Washington, DC), S.T.B. (Dominican House of Studies, Washington, DC) and a S.T.L. (International Marian Research Institute, Dayton). He practices with the Congregation of Marian Fathers of the Immaculate Conception of the Most Blessed Virgin Mary.

Calloway leads pilgrimages around the world to Marian shrines. He has led tours of the Holy Land with actor Jim Caviezel.

"The Surfer Priest" 

Calloway’s favorite hobby is surfing. He is known as “the surfing priest” or "the surfer priest". “To be honest, I like the danger and difficulty of it,” Calloway said. “I like a challenge. My whole life I have loved the ocean."

Consecration to Saint Joseph 

Believing "the world needs St. Joseph now more than ever," Calloway created a Consecration of St. Joseph and published a book of the same title in 2020. Calloway's consecration to St. Joseph is modeled after the Consecration to Mary of St. Louis de Montfort. 

Calloway has stated that "the first person to entrust himself to the spiritual care of Joseph and Mary was actually Jesus." In his book, Calloway writes that consecration to St. Joseph means “that you acknowledge that he is your spiritual father, and you want to be like him. To show it, you entrust yourself entirely to his paternal care so that he can lovingly help you acquire his virtues and become holy. St. Joseph, in turn, will give those consecrated to him his loving attention, protection and guidance.”

Calloway's book Consecration to St. Joseph: The Wonders of Our Spiritual Father has sold more than one million copies worldwide and is available in over fifteen languages. A website is maintained for the book at www.consecrationtostjoseph.org.

Calloway also published a follow-up entitled Consecration to St. Joseph for Children and Families with co-author Scott L. Smith, Jr. in 2022.

Awards and recognitions 

Calloway's conversion story was made into a documentary titled The Testimony of Fr. Donald Calloway, which won an Emmy award in 2017.

A talk Calloway gave in April 2017, titled; 'The Rosary: Spiritual Sword of Our Lady', had over one million views on YouTube by July 2020.

Bibliography 
Calloway is the author of a number of books related to Roman Catholicism. His work has been covered in several mainstream Roman Catholic newspapers.

 No Turning Back: A Witness to Mercy (2007)
 Purest of All Lilies: The Virgin Mary in the Spirituality of St. Faustina (2008)
 Under the Mantle: Marians Thoughts from a 21st Century Priest (2013)
 Marian Gems: Daily Wisdom on Our Lady (2014)
 Mary of Nazareth: The Life of Our Lady in Pictures (2014)
 St. Joseph Gems: Daily Wisdom on Our Spiritual Father (2018)
 Consecration to St. Joseph: The Wonders of Our Spiritual Father (2020)
 Consecration to St. Joseph for Children and Families with co-author Scott L. Smith, Jr.

Books on the Rosary:
 How to Pray the Rosary (2017)
 26 Champions of the Rosary: The Essential Guide to the Greatest Heroes of the Rosary (2017)
 10 Wonders of the Rosary (2019)
 Rosary Gems: Daily Wisdom on the Holy Rosary (2015)
 Champions of the Rosary (2016)

References

External links 

1972 births
Living people
American Roman Catholic priests
Converts to Roman Catholicism from Anglicanism
People from Dearborn, Michigan
Franciscan University of Steubenville alumni
21st-century American Roman Catholic theologians